This is a list of foreign players who have played international football for the Algerian national football team.

The following players:
have played at least one game for the full Algeria international team.
have not been born inside Algeria and qualify through the FIFA grand parent rules,
16 of the Algeria players selected for the 2014 FIFA World Cup squad had been born in France. This followed rule changes by FIFA which allowed players to switch nationality, so long as they had not played in a competitive senior international match. Eight players in the 2014 Algeria squad had played for France youth teams.

Key

List of players

By country of birth

See also
List of Algerian international footballers

References

born outside
Algeria
Association football player non-biographical articles
Footballers
Algeria